Noorpur Ki Rani is a Pakistani teledrama which was broadcast on Hum TV from 25 April 2009 to on 3 October 2009. Written by Pakistani author and screenwriter Samira Fazal, and directed by Haissam Hussain, Noorpur Ki Rani was based on the English novel Rebecca by Daphne Du Maurier.

Noorpur Ki Rani  was also broadcast in India on the channel Zindagi beginning 13 July 2014.  and was also released on Zee5.

Cast
 Sanam Baloch as Noorulain Aneez  
 Mahnoor Baloch as Rania
 Noman Ijaz as Salar
 Samina Peerzada as Anna
 Ayesha Gul
 Shehnaz Pervaiz as Amma Jee
 Sanam Agha as Sonia
 Zaheen Tahira
 Qavi Khan
 Naeema Garaj as Nimrah
 Naila Jaffri as Noorulain's khala	
 Uday Nair
 Azfar Rehman as Nofil
 Mahira Bhatti as Hareem

Plot
The story revolves around Noorulain Aneez, often referred to as Noorie, who is an orphan, and accidentally lands into a rich palace which has an old man and his daughter residing. Both wanted to adopt a male child whom they would bring up and educate so that he would become the heir of their property. After a little hesitation, Noorie is accepted by them, and is given good care & attention in the field of education and social manners.

See also 
 Dil, Diya, Dehleez
 Aashti
 Mannchalay
 Man-o-Salwa
 Manay Na Ye Dil
 Malaal

References

2009 Pakistani television series debuts
2009 Pakistani television series endings
Pakistani drama television series
Television shows set in Karachi
Hum TV original programming
Urdu-language telenovelas
Pakistani telenovelas
Zee Zindagi original programming
Works based on Rebecca (novel)